The Women's Super-G competition at the 2013 World Championships was held on Tuesday, February 5, with 59 athletes from 28 countries entered. The first race of the championships, it was scheduled for an 11:00 (CET) start. Due to marginal weather, the start was delayed in 15-minute increments until 14:30; the race was called completed after just 30 finishers (36 athletes), due to fog.

World Cup overall leader Tina Maze won the world title, with Lara Gut and Julia Mancuso on the podium.

Lindsey Vonn was involved in a severe crash midway through the course and was airlifted to a nearby hospital. She tore her anterior cruciate ligament and medial collateral ligament in her right knee and sustained a lateral tibial plateau fracture.

Results
The race was started at 14:30.

References

External links
  
 FIS-Ski.com - AWSC 2013 - calendar & results

Women's Super-G
2013 in Austrian women's sport
FIS